Bowman Creek is an unincorporated community in Monroe Township in Wyoming County, Pennsylvania. Bowman Creek is located at the intersection of state routes 29 and 309, south of Tunkhannock.

References

Unincorporated communities in Pennsylvania
Unincorporated communities in Wyoming County, Pennsylvania